These are the Official Charts Company's UK Indie Chart number-one albums of 2010.

Chart history

See also
List of UK Albums Chart number ones of the 2010s
List of UK Dance Albums Chart number ones of 2010
List of UK Album Downloads Chart number ones of the 2010s
List of UK Independent Singles Chart number ones of 2010
List of UK Independent Singles Chart number ones of 2010
List of UK R&B Albums Chart number ones of 2010

References

External links
Independent Albums Chart at the Official Charts Company
UK Top 40 Indie Album Chart at BBC Radio 1

2010 in British music
United Kingdom Indie Albums
2010